Macklin Leslie Hancock  (1925 - September 14, 2010) was an Order of Ontario winning urban planner, who was integral in planning Don Mills.

The son of Dorothy Macklin and Leslie Hancock, he was born in Nanking, China. The family was forced to leave China following the revolution of 1927. Hancock was educated in Port Credit, Ontario, at the Ontario Agricultural College and at Harvard Graduate School of Design. He served as a pilot during World War II. He was a founding member of Project Planning Associates Limited and served as its president.

Hancock died at Sunnybrook Hospital in Toronto.

References

External links
 Macklin Leslie Hancock, University of Guelph

1925 births
2010 deaths
Canadian urban planners
Members of the Order of Ontario
Canadian expatriates in China
Ontario Agricultural College alumni
Harvard Graduate School of Design alumni